Center is an unincorporated community located in Metcalfe County, Kentucky, United States. The community is part of the Glasgow Micropolitan Statistical Area

Center is home to the former North Metcalfe Elementary, which was part of the Metcalfe County School District. Today the structure houses the Roadside BBQ and Grill.

History
Center, also known in the past as Frederick or Lafayette, got its name from its location, equidistant from four county seats.

References

Unincorporated communities in Metcalfe County, Kentucky
Unincorporated communities in Kentucky
Glasgow, Kentucky, micropolitan area